Pholetesor is a genus of braconid wasps in the family Braconidae. There are more than 50 described species in Pholetesor, found mainly in the Holarctic.

Species
These 57 species belong to the genus Pholetesor:

 Pholetesor acricauda Liu & Chen, 2016
 Pholetesor acutus (Papp, 1971)
 Pholetesor ambiguus (Papp, 1977)
 Pholetesor argyresthiae Liu & Chen, 2016
 Pholetesor arisba (Nixon, 1973)
 Pholetesor artusisulcus Liu & Chen, 2016
 Pholetesor bedelliae (Viereck, 1911)
 Pholetesor bicolor (Nees, 1874)
 Pholetesor brevivalvatus (Balevski & Tobias, 1980)
 Pholetesor bucculatricis (Muesebeck, 1921)
 Pholetesor caloptiliae Whitfield, 2006
 Pholetesor chiricahuensis Whitfield, 2006
 Pholetesor circumlatus Kotenko, 2007
 Pholetesor circumscriptus (Nees, 1834)
 Pholetesor confusus Liu & Chen, 2016
 Pholetesor dixianus Whitfield, 2006
 Pholetesor dmitriyi Kotenko, 2007
 Pholetesor elpis (Nixon, 1973)
 Pholetesor errans (Nixon, 1973)
 Pholetesor extentus (Papp, 1977)
 Pholetesor flavigleba Liu & Chen, 2016
 Pholetesor flaviparvus Liu & Chen, 2016
 Pholetesor glacialis (Ashmead, 1902)
 Pholetesor hanniae (Valerio & Whitfield, 2003)
 Pholetesor hayati Akhtar, 2010
 Pholetesor ingenuoides (Papp, 1971)
 Pholetesor ingenuus (Tobias, 1964)
 Pholetesor intercedens (Tobias, 1977)
 Pholetesor kuwayamai (Watanabe, 1932)
 Pholetesor laetus (Marshall, 1885)
 Pholetesor lithocolletis Liu & Chen, 2016
 Pholetesor longicoxis Whitfield, 2006
 Pholetesor lyonetiae Liu & Chen, 2016
 Pholetesor maritimus (Wilkinson, 1941)
 Pholetesor masneri (Mason, 1981)
 Pholetesor masoni Whitfield, 2006
 Pholetesor moczari Papp, 2014
 Pholetesor nanus (Reinhard, 1880)
 Pholetesor ornigis (Weed, 1887)
 Pholetesor phaetusa (Nixon, 1973)
 Pholetesor pinifoliellae Whitfield, 2006
 Pholetesor powelli Whitfield, 2006
 Pholetesor pseudocircumscriptus Abdoli, 2019
 Pholetesor rhygoplitoides Whitfield, 2006
 Pholetesor rohweri (Muesebeck, 1921)
 Pholetesor rufulus (Tobias, 1964)
 Pholetesor salalicus (Mason, 1959)
 Pholetesor salicifoliellae (Mason, 1959)
 Pholetesor spinadensus Liu & Chen, 2016
 Pholetesor taiwanensis Liu & Chen, 2016
 Pholetesor teresitergum Liu & Chen, 2016
 Pholetesor terneicus Kotenko, 2007
 Pholetesor thuiellae Whitfield, 2006
 Pholetesor variabilis Whitfield, 2006
 Pholetesor viminetorum (Wesmael, 1837)
 Pholetesor zelleriae Whitfield, 2006
 Pholetesor zherikhini Kotenko, 2007

References

Further reading

 
 
 

Microgastrinae